The 2021 Fan Controlled Football season is the first season of the Fan Controlled Football (FCF), a professional indoor football league.

The FCF, which sees itself as "Esports and traditional sports colliding together" is unique because the league leans heavily on fan interaction to make important decisions, such as play-calling, drafts, rules, team names and seasonal awards with voting done through a mobile app, a concept the owners first tested in the Indoor Football League when they owned the Salt Lake Screaming Eagles, later giving up ownership of the team when they started the FCF.

The Fan Controlled Football League's (FCFL) first season initial start date was originally in 2018 but was postponed. It was later slated to start in summer 2020 in Las Vegas with eight teams, but was postponed due to the COVID-19 pandemic. The league shortened its name to Fan Controlled Football (FCF) and announced it would play with four teams in February 2021 in a bubble environment at the Infinite Energy Arena in Duluth, Georgia. (FCF thus became the third different high-profile professional football league to play in the weeks immediately following the Super Bowl in as many years, following the Alliance of American Football in 2019 and the XFL in 2020; FCF was the first of those to complete its inaugural season as scheduled.)

The league began play on February 13, 2021, with four teams competing in a 12-game-format over six weeks. The league uses Internet streaming as its main television platform and is streamed on Twitch and VENN on Saturdays, with reruns on FTF; the league championship is carried on the digital subchannel network LX. The FCF saw a steady increase in its viewership through its first five weeks, from 735,000 in the first week to 2.1 million in the playoffs.

Following a four-game season where the Beasts took home the regular season championship, the playoffs concluded with the #1 seed Beasts losing to the #4 seed Glacier Boyz in an upset and #2 seed Wild Aces easily defeating the #3 seed Zappers. The Wild Aces beat the Glacier Boyz 46–40 in the final, named the People's Championship, as voted by the fans, on March 20, 2021.

Players were paid weekly minimum of $400 to $750 plus room and board, while coaches got paid $3,500 per month with housing and meal plan.

Teams 
The 2021 season was originally said to have eight teams, which was reduced to four due to the COVID-19 pandemic. All teams have no geographic location that they are based in, similar to ESports teams. All teams share position coaches, doctors and trainers, marketing staffs and practice squad.

2021 Beasts season

The Beasts won their first franchise game 48–44 against the Zappers and former Heisman winner Johnny Manziel on February 13, 2021.

On March 5, 2021, to load up for the Playoffs, The Beasts signed Robert Turbin, a former teammate of team owner Marshawn Lynch.

The Beasts finished the regular season 3–1, securing the #1 seed in the playoffs, but ultimately ended up losing to the #4 seed Glacier Boyz 38–20 in the semi-finals, Finishing the 2021 Fan Controlled Football season 3–2.

2021 Glacier Boyz season

2021 Wild Aces season

The Wild Aces won their first franchise game 30–22 against the Glacier Boyz on February 13, 2021. The Aces finished the season 2–2 and earning 2nd-place in the league's regular season standings. Their week two franchise-tagged super back Ladarius Galloway was given the regular season Offensive MVP and Joseph Putu was given the Defensive MVP. The Beasts (3–1) finished 1st, the Zappers (2–2) finished 3rd, and the Glacier Boyz (1–3) finished 4th. They ultimately ended up winning against the #3 seed Zappers 32–6 in the semi-finals, advancing to The People's Championship.

Right before the game, it was revealed that former Baylor and XFL defensive end Shawn Oakman had signed with the Wild Aces. The Wild Aces won the People's Championship v1.0 game against the #4 seed Glacier Boyz 46–40, finishing the 2021 Fan Controlled Football season 4–2 and earning their 1st championship in franchise history. Dual-threat quarterback Ed Crouch was named People's Championship Gatorade MVP. Crouch went 4 for 9 with 72 yards and 1 passing touchdown. He also rushed 6 times for 53 yards and added a rushing touchdown. His rushing touchdown came on the last play of the game where he faked a run to Galloway and outran a defender to touch the pilon with no time left on the clock.

Final roster

2021 Zappers season

On December 30, 2020, It was announced that former Heisman Trophy winner Johnny Manziel had signed with the Zappers.

The Zappers lost their first franchise game 48–44 against the Beasts on February 13, 2021.

On February 27, 2021, it was announced that Josh Gordon had signed with the Zappers after being suspended indefinitely by the NFL.

The Beasts finished the regular season 2–2, securing the #2 seed in the playoffs, but ultimately lost to the #2 seed Wild Aces 32–6 in the semifinals, finishing the 2021 Fan Controlled Football season 2–3.

Players 
The FCF started its combines and scouting for players as early as January 2019, starting originally with asking fans to recommend players and then later holding combines in Atlanta, Dallas, Columbus and then Las Vegas. Following the cancellation of the Summer 2020 season, the league held further combines in October 2020 in Houston and Pittsburgh then another in Atlanta in November 2020. In December 2020, the FCF signed former Heisman trophy winner and NFL first round pick, quarterback Johnny Manziel and Florida State quarterback Deondre Francois. They also signed former NFL player Quinn Porter, Douglas McNeil III, Jeremiah Poutasi and former XFL players Damon Sheehy-Guiseppi and Quinton Flowers.

The league has no set teams with all players being drafted to teams before the first week of the season. This draft is done via voting by fans in the FCF app. The same is done every week until the playoffs. To stop a player from being drafted by other teams, fans can vote on using a "franchise tag" which will permanently attach the player to the team for the entire season. Players can be selected by their own team in the draft to stop them from being drafted by another team.

Josh Gordon signed with the FCF on March 6, 2021 after being released by the Seattle Seahawks, entering the bubble soon after to appear in Week 4 as his FCF debut with the Zappers. Robert Turbin also signed at the same time though entered the bubble later, making his debut appearance for the Beasts in the playoffs.

Franchise Players 
Franchise Players are players that were voted to be "protected" from other teams in the draft.

Beasts 

Quinton Flowers (QB/RB)
T.J. Edwards II (QB)
Troy Evans Jr. (WR)
Christian Saulsberry (WR)
 Marloshawn Franklin Jr. (CB)

Glacier Boyz 

David Pindell (QB)
Calen Campbell (RB)
Andrew Jamiel (WR)
KaVontae Turpin (WR)
 Dominick Sanders (CB)

Wild Aces 

Jackson Erdmann (QB)
LaDarius Galloway (RB)
Raphael Leonard (WR)
Richaud Floyd (WR)
Joseph Putu (CB)

Zappers 

Johnny Manziel (QB)
Logan Marchi (QB)
Josh Gordon (WR)
Travis Toivonen (WR)
Marquill Osborne (CB)

Notable players 

 Jackson Erdmann (QB)
 Quinton Flowers (QB/RB)
 Deondre Francois (QB)
 Josh Gordon (WR)
Madre London (RB)
 Johnny Manziel (QB)
 Douglas McNeil III (WR)
 Shawn Oakman (DL)
 Quinn Porter (RB)
 Jeremiah Poutasi (OL)
 Damon Sheehy-Guiseppi (WR)
 Robert Turbin (RB)
 KaVontae Turpin (WR)

Regular season standings 

Bold indicates top seed

Playoffs 
Fans voted for which team would face the top-seeded Beasts in the semifinal.

Statistical leaders 
Records reflect statistics through six weeks of games.

Awards

References

External links
 Official website

2021
Fan Controlled Football, 2021
Fan Controlled Football
Events in Duluth, Georgia
Sports competitions in Georgia (U.S. state)